Agogo is a town in the Asante Akim North Municipal District of the Ashanti Region of Ghana. Agogo is approximately 80 kilometers east of Kumasi, the capital of the Ashanti Region, and had a population of 28,271 in the 2000 census. Computer projections estimate that the 2007 population was 32,859.

History

Around the year 1500, the people of the Aduana clan in Asantemanso, who were originally from Esumegya, dispersed to settle in different parts of the country. One group settled at Nyanawase under Ansa Sasraku, but moved again after a series of wars with the Ashantis and the Gas. In the end they settled in Akwamu.

In or around the year 1600, three chiefs of the Aduana clan: Ofori Krobon of Agogo, Ntori Nimpa of Kwaman, and Effa Kai of Kumawu left Akwamu to join forces under the command of Ofori Krobon of Agogo with the intention of fighting and defeating Ataara Finam. He was the supreme ruler of the Afram plains at that time. This war lasted for almost three years. All the lands controlled by the vanquished Ataara Finam were annexed to the three stools who were independent of each other. Because of this annexation, the three stools - Agogo, Kumawu and Kwaman - all controlled some of the most extensive land possessions in the Ashanti Union. Their lands extended to Akwamu, the Volta Region, Brong Ahafo and to parts of the Northern Region.

Meanwhile, the people of Agogo settled in Santenso, which is where the three-year war with Ataara Finam came to an end. Like all other Asante states, the people of Agogo had remained an independent entity until the need to form a union of states became apparent. The people of Agogo did directly participate in the Denkyira war in 1698, which concluded in the liberation of Asanteman from Denkyira under Ashanti King Asantehene Osei Tutu I. However, they did contribute men and materials to support the Ashanti forces.

Geography

Agogo is located at 6.80004 (latitude in decimal degrees), -1.08193 (longitude in decimal degrees) at an elevation/altitude of 396 meters. The average elevation of Agogo in Asante Akim North Municipal is 396 meters.

Agogo has a tropical savannah climate.

Culture

Agogo celebrates the Akogya Siakwan Festival, which is a festival of peace, thanksgiving, love and harmony among the communities, in recognition of their primordial selves. The people of Agogo have a strong sense of identity and associate the festival with their faith in Akogya, the river that guards the town.

Government

Agogo is the capital of the Asante-Akim North District Assembly (AANDA) and is in the Asante-Akim North parliamentary constituency in Ashanti Region. Agogo is represented by Hon. Andy Appiah Kubi as its Member of Parliament (MP). Andy Appiah Kubi has held this parliamentary position since January 7, 2017 and succeeded Hon. Kwadwo Baah Agyemang.

Nana Kwame Akuoko Sarpong is the paramount chief or Omanhene of the Agogo Traditional Area.

Agriculture

Farming is the main economic activity in Agogo, contributing about 70% of the town's economic output. The town is well noted for growing plantain, watermelon, and tomatoes.

Education

Agogo has a number of schools, including Junior High Schools, Senior Secondary Schools, and Tertiary Institutions.

Junior high schools
APCE Demonstrations A, B & C Basic Schools
Agogo L/A 2 School
Agogo Methodist Primary/JHS
Ramseyer Preparatory School
Youth Institute of Science & Technology NGO School
Agogo presby Primary/JHS
St. Augustine R/C Primary/JHS
Ebenezer preparatory school
Brako preparatory school
Joy international school
Agogo L/A 6 JHS
Ahmaddiya Muslim Primary School
Agogo D/A Saviour Primary/JHS
Agogo Presbyterian Basic A, B & C Schools
Penticost D/A Primary/JHS
Islamic Basic School
Andrews Preparatory School
Kyei Preparatory School
St Anthony International School
Papa Agyei International School
Apostolic D/A Basic School
Blessed Kids Academy
Fountain Christian Academy

Senior high schools
Agogo State Senior High School
Collins Senior High School

Tertiary institutions
Agogo Presbyterian College of Education
Agogo Presbyterian Nurses And Midwifery Training College
Pentecost Bible College, Agogo campus
Presbyterian University College, Agogo campus

Tourism

The town is noted for its uniquely hilly landscape, earning it the name "Naturally Walled Town." Agogo also boasts of waterfalls at Hwidiem and Onyemso.

Sports
Sports plays a very important role in the lives of the people in Agogo. The key sporting events/activities in the town include, but not limited to football (Soccer), track and field events, table tennis, handball, basketball, volleyball and netball. Aside the usual tournaments organised among Junior High, Senior High, and Tertiary Institutions, there are other sporting events. Among them is the annual Asante Akim Marathon Challenge.

There are football clubs in Agogo. They include D.C United Agogo, and Pacific Heroes.

Institutions

Agogo's Presbyterian Hospital, established 21 March 1931, is the oldest mission hospital in Ashanti and Ghana. Its Ophthalmology program serves patients from Ashanti, Ghana, Burkina Faso, Côte d'Ivoire, and Togo.

There is a collaboration with the Kumasi Centre for Collaborative Research (KCCR) in Kumasi, which is part of the Kwame Nkrumah University of Science and Technology Kumasi and associated with the Bernhard Nocht Institute for Tropical Medicine in Hamburg, Germany.

The Asante-Akyem campus of Presbyterian University College is in Agogo, with a health and medical sciences department affiliated with the hospital.

Agogo and Fort Lauderdale, Florida, in partnership with Fort Lauderdale-based Citrix Systems and Sister Cities International, launched the prototype Cyber Sister Cities (CSC) program.

Notable people

Hon. Kwadwo Baah-Wiredu (late Finance Minister, Republic of Ghana)
Hon kwadwo Baah Agyemang former member of parliament and currently board chairman, national sports authority
Richmond Boakye, football player
Dan Amakye Dede, Highlife Legend
Ofori Amponsah, highlife Musician
Kofi B, also known as Kofi Boakye Yiadom and Kofi B., Musician 
Okuraseni Samuel, son of Samuel Obeng Wiafe Sr, played with Amakye Dede's band.
Frank Osei, former player of Asante Kotoko player and Ghana National U-20
Akoto Danso popularly known as Osreben, formally played for Ashanti Gold FC and now plays for Okwawu United FC, all in Ghana
F.P. Kyei Former Inspector General Of Police,(IGP) of the Ghana Police Service from 27/11/1979 to 6/10/1981
Dr. Joyce Lucy Asibey First Ghanaian headmistress of Aburi Girls' Senior High School
Anita Osei Esq, former Miss Malaika Ghana Top 5 delegate and lawyer

Sister city

Agogo has a sister city:

References

External links 
 Presbyterian University College, Agogo
 Agogo Presbytarian Hospital
 KCCR
 YIST

Populated places in the Ashanti Region
Ashanti Empire
Society of Ghana